Iron-based superconductors (FeSC) are iron-containing chemical compounds whose superconducting properties were discovered in 2006.
In 2008, led by recently discovered iron pnictide compounds (originally known as oxypnictides), they were in the first stages of experimentation and implementation. (Previously most high-temperature superconductors were cuprates and being based on layers of copper and oxygen sandwiched between other substances (La, Ba, Hg)).

This new type of superconductors is based instead on conducting layers of iron and a pnictide (chemical elements in group 15 of the periodic table, here typically arsenic (As) and phosphorus (P)) and seems to show promise as the next generation of high temperature superconductors.

Much of the interest is because the new compounds are very different from the cuprates and may help lead to a theory of non-BCS-theory superconductivity.

More recently these have been called the ferropnictides. The first ones found belong to the group of oxypnictides. Some of the compounds have been known since 1995, 
and their semiconductive properties have been known and patented since 2006.

It has also been found that some iron chalcogens superconduct. The undoped β-FeSe is the simplest iron-based superconductor but with the diverse properties. It has a critical temperature (Tc) of 8 K at normal pressure, and 36.7 K under high pressure and by means of intercalation. The combination of both intercalation and pressure results in re-emerging superconductivity at 48 (see  and references therein).

A subset of iron-based superconductors with properties similar to the oxypnictides, known as the 122 iron arsenides, attracted attention in 2008 due to their relative ease of synthesis.

The oxypnictides such as LaOFeAs are often referred to as the '1111' pnictides.

Iron pnictide superconductors crystallize into the [FeAs] layered structure alternating with spacer or charge reservoir block. 
The compounds can thus be classified into “1111” system RFeAsO (R: the rare earth element) including LaFeAsO, SmFeAsO, PrFeAsO, etc.; “122” type BaFe2As2, SrFe2As2 or CaFe2As2; “111” type LiFeAs, NaFeAs, and LiFeP. Doping or applied pressure will transform the compounds into superconductors.

Compounds such as Sr2ScFePO3 discovered in 2009 are referred to as the '42622' family, as FePSr2ScO3. Noteworthy is the synthesis of (Ca4Al2O6−y)(Fe2Pn2) (or Al-42622(Pn); Pn = As and P) using high-pressure synthesis technique. Al-42622(Pn) exhibit superconductivity for both Pn = As and P with the transition temperatures of 28.3 K and 17.1 K, respectively. The a-lattice parameters of Al-42622(Pn) (a = 3.713 Å and 3.692 Å for Pn = As and P, respectively) are smallest among the iron-pnictide superconductors. Correspondingly, Al-42622(As) has the smallest As-Fe-As bond angle (102.1°) and the largest As distance from the Fe planes (1.5 Å). High-pressure technique also yields (Ca3Al2O5−y)(Fe2Pn2) (Pn = As and P), the first reported iron-based superconductors with the perovskite-based '32522' structure. The transition temperature (Tc) is 30.2 K for Pn = As and 16.6 K for Pn = P. The emergence of superconductivity is ascribed to the small tetragonal a-axis lattice constant of these materials. From these results, an empirical relationship was established between the a-axis lattice constant and Tc in iron-based superconductors.

In 2009, it was shown that undoped iron pnictides had a magnetic quantum critical point deriving from competition between electronic localization and itinerancy.

Phase diagrams
Similarly to superconducting cuprates, the properties of iron based superconductors change dramatically with doping. Parent compounds of FeSC are usually metals (unlike the cuprates) but, similarly to cuprates, are ordered antiferromagnetically that often termed as a spin-density wave (SDW). The superconductivity (SC) emerges upon either hole or electron doping. In general, the phase diagram is similar to the cuprates.

Superconductivity at high temperature

Superconducting transition temperatures are listed in the tables (some at high pressure). BaFe1.8Co0.2As2 is predicted to have an upper critical field of 43 tesla from the measured coherence length of 2.8 nm.

In 2011, Japanese scientists made a discovery which increased a metal compound's superconductivity by immersing iron-based compounds in hot alcoholic beverages such as red wine. Earlier reports indicated that excess Fe is the cause of the bicollinear antiferromagnetic order and is not in favor of superconductivity. Further investigation revealed that weak acid has the ability to deintercalate the excess Fe from the interlayer sites. Therefore, weak acid annealing suppresses the antiferromagnetic correlation by deintercalating the excess Fe and, hence superconductivity is achieved.

There is an empirical correlation of the transition temperature with electronic band structure: the Tc maximum is observed when some of the Fermi surface stays in proximity to Lifshitz topological transition. Similar correlation has been later reported for high-Tc cuprates that indicates possible similarity of the superconductivity mechanisms in these two families of high temperature superconductors.

Thin films

The critical temperature is increased further in thin-films of iron chalcogenides on suitable substrates. In 2015, a Tc of around 105-111 K was observed in thin films of iron selenide grown on strontium titanate.

See also

Andreev reflection
Charge-transfer complex
Color superconductivity in quarks
Composite reaction texturing
Conventional superconductor
Covalent superconductor
High-temperature superconductivity
Homes's law
Kondo effect
Little–Parks effect
Magnetic sail
National Superconducting Cyclotron Laboratory
Oxypnictide
Proximity effect
Room-temperature superconductor
Rutherford cable
Spallation Neutron Source
Superconducting radio frequency
Superconductor classification
Superfluid film
Technological applications of superconductivity
Timeline of low-temperature technology
Type-I superconductor
Type-II superconductor
Unconventional superconductor

References

Superconductors
Iron compounds